Jacobsen is an upscale brand of specialty beers owned by Carlsberg. Named after Carlsberg's founder, J.C. Jacobsen, it is housed in the original Carlsberg brewery in Valby in Copenhagen, Denmark and is currently headed by brewmaster Morten Ibsen.

History 

The Jacobsen Brewhouse (Husbryggeriet Jacobsen in Danish) officially opened on 31 May 2005. Its creation was intended to spearhead Carlsberg's renewed focus on specialty beers in response to the growing market segment sparked by the microbrewery movement. The brewery currently has an annual production capacity of 1,700,000 litres (equal to 5 million 330 ml bottles), but has the potential of doubling in size to 3,500,000 litres. Originally only available in Denmark, Jacobsen has now expanded its distribution to limited areas in Norway, Sweden, Finland, and the United States.

Product line 

The original launch for Jacobsen included four beers:
Jacobsen Bramley Whit—A Belgian style wheat beer flavored with Bramley apples.
Jacobsen Brown Ale—An English inspired ale. 
Jacobsen Original Dark Lager—Based on J.C. Jacobsen's original recipe from 1854.
Jacobsen Saaz Blonde—A Belgian inspired pale ale.

Several other beers have been introduced since then:
Jacobsen Camomile Dubbel—A double ale with a hint of chamomile. 
Jacobsen Extra Pilsner—A "luxury" pilsner with high-quality ingredients. 
Jacobsen Golden Naked Christmas Ale—A specially spiced beer only available during the holiday season.
Jacobsen Husbryg—Every year the brewmaster creates 3-4 'House brews' that are available for only a limited time at the brewery itself. The current Husbryg is Nordisk Sommer Ale.

External links
 Jacobsenbeer.com - Official website
 Ratebeer.com
 Skummer.com (Danish)

Beer in Denmark
Danish brands
Valby